Marvin Saúl Sánchez Vallecillo (born 2 November 1986) is a Honduran football midfielder who currently plays for Platense in the Primera Division of Honduras.

Club career
Sánchez started his career at Platense before moving to F.C. Motagua for the 2009 Clausura. He moved abroad to play for Salvadoran side Municipal Limeño in January 2010 and in summer 2010 he joined Vida.
In summer 2012, Sánchez reluctantly had to train with Atlético Choloma, since they owned his registration. He later denied any problems with Choloma, though he was said to be close to signing for Real España.

International career
He was part of the Honduras U-20 team at the 2005 World Youth Championship in the Netherlands. Sánchez was also part of the U-23 Honduras national football team who was coached by Colombian trainer Alexis Mendoza but was then coached by Gilberto Yearwood. The U-23 Honduras national football team were CONCACAF champions and qualified to the 2008 Summer Olympics. He made his debut for the senior national side on 22 May 2008 in a friendly against Belize.

Honours
 National team
 2008 CONCACAF U-23

Statistics

International goals

References

External links

1986 births
Living people
People from Puerto Cortés
Association football midfielders
Honduran footballers
Honduras international footballers
Footballers at the 2008 Summer Olympics
Olympic footballers of Honduras
Platense F.C. players
F.C. Motagua players
Hispano players
C.D.S. Vida players
Atlético Choloma players
Honduran expatriate footballers
Expatriate footballers in El Salvador
Liga Nacional de Fútbol Profesional de Honduras players